Events from the year 1747 in art.

Events
 August – Jean-Bernard, abbé Le Blanc, writes an influential letter on the subject of the Paris Salon.
 Charles-Amédée-Philippe van Loo joins the Académie Royale de Peinture et de Sculpture. Later in the year he marries Marie-Marguerite Lebrun.

Works
 Francis Bindon – Portrait of Richard Baldwin, Provost of Trinity College, Dublin
 Canaletto – London seen through an arch of Westminster Bridge (c. 1746–47)
 Thomas Gainsborough – Wooded Landscape with a Peasant Resting (Tate Britain)
 Matthäus Günther – Frescos in Amorbach Abbey (1742–47)
 Charles-Joseph Natoire
 Portrait of Louis, Dauphin of France
 Saint Stephen and the False Witnesses (for Abbey of Saint-Germain-des-Prés)
 Triumph of Bacchus (Musée du Louvre)
 Gervase Spencer – Portrait miniatures

Awards

Births
 January 4 – Dominique Vivant, French artist, writer, diplomat, author and archaeologist (died 1825)
 March 8 – Johann Peter Melchior, German porcelain modeller (died 1825)
 September 30 – Friedrich Justin Bertuch, German patron of the arts (died 1822)
 December 8 – Louis Gerverot, French porcelain painter (died 1829)
 date unknown
 William Ellis, English engraver (died 1810)
 Giuseppe Quaglio, Italian painter and stage designer (died 1828)
 Jean Simeon Rousseau de la Rottière, French decorative painter (died 1820)
 Margareta Seuerling, Swedish actor and theater director (died 1820)
 Shiba Kōkan, born Andō Kichirō, Japanese painter and printmaker (died 1818)
 Francis Wheatley, English painter and engraver (died 1801)

Deaths
 January 26 – Willem van Mieris, Dutch painter from Leyden (born 1662)
 April 3 – Francesco Solimena, Italian painter and draughtsmen (born 1657)
 July 17 – Giuseppe Maria Crespi, Italian painter of the Bolognese School (born 1665)
 November 7 – Giuseppe Melani, Italian painter, active mainly in Pisa (born 1673)
 date unknown
 Elias Baeck, German painter and engraver (born 1679)
 Maurice Baquoy, French engraver (born 1680)
 Giovanni Battista Canossa, Italian wood engraver (born unknown)
 Claude Charles, French historical and decorative painter (born 1661)
 Tommaso Costanzi, Italian gem engraver of the late-Baroque period (born 1700)
 Michael Ignaz Mildorfer, Austrian painter (born 1690)

 
Years of the 18th century in art
1740s in art